Carola Hornig ( Miseler, born 30 April 1962 in Stendal) is a German rower.

References 
 
 

1962 births
Living people
People from Stendal
People from Bezirk Magdeburg
East German female rowers
Sportspeople from Saxony-Anhalt
Olympic rowers of East Germany
Rowers at the 1988 Summer Olympics
Olympic gold medalists for East Germany
Olympic medalists in rowing
Medalists at the 1988 Summer Olympics
World Rowing Championships medalists for East Germany
Recipients of the Patriotic Order of Merit in gold